The 1940 Iowa State Cyclones football team represented Iowa State College of Agricultural and Mechanic Arts (later renamed Iowa State University) in the Big Six Conference during the 1940 college football season. In their fourth and final season under head coach James J. Yeager, the Cyclones compiled a 4–5 record (2–3 against conference opponents), finished in fourth place in the conference, and were outscored by opponents by a combined total of 132 to 118. They played their home games at Clyde Williams Field in Ames, Iowa.

Tom Smith was the team captain. No Iowa State player was selected as a first-team all-conference player.

Schedule

References

Iowa State
Iowa State Cyclones football seasons
Iowa State Cyclones football